Little Bromley is a village and civil parish in the Tendring district of Essex, England. The name "Bromley" is Old English for "broomy wood/clearing". It is surrounded by the parishes of Lawford, Ardleigh, Great Bromley, Little Bentley, and Mistley. The population was reported to be 426 in the 1841 census,  361 in the 1911 census, 289 in the 2001 census, and 253 in the 2011 census. The main economic activity is arable farming. The village shop, mentioned in Kelly's Directory of Essex (1914), ceased operating in the 1990s.

The Anglican Church of St Mary the Virgin, is no longer used for regular worship and is in the care of the Churches Conservation Trust.  A Methodist chapel, built in 1863, closed in the late 1980s.

Nearby places

References

External links

  Entry in "History, Gazetteer, and Directory of the County of Essex" by William White, 1848
 Entry in Kelly's Directory of Essex, 1914
  Village website

Villages in Essex
Civil parishes in Essex
Tendring